David Brady (born 1974) is an Irish former Gaelic footballer who played for the Mayo county team in midfield in the 1990s and 2000s. As of 2020, he works as a journalist.

Early life
Brady grew up in Ballina, County Mayo; his mother was from Mayo and his father from Castleconor, County Sligo. He has twin younger brothers, Ger Brady and Liam Brady.

Playing career
Brady played in midfield for Ballina Stephenites and Mayo.

In 1994 and 1995 he was on the under-21 teams that lost the All-Ireland Under-21 Football Championship final.

Brady was on the Mayo team that lost the 1996 All-Ireland Senior Football Championship Final; he missed the 1997 final due to a broken leg. Mayo won the 2000–01 National Football League and Brady was also on the team that lost the 2004 All-Ireland Senior Football Championship Final.

In 2005 his club Ballina Stephenites won the All-Ireland Senior Club Football Championship, Brady finally winning an All-Ireland final after losing his first seven.

In 2003 Brady retired from the inter-county team, but returned; he retired again in 2005, but returned to play on the Mayo team that lost the 2006 All-Ireland Senior Football Championship Final.

He finally retired in 2008, in part due to back pain.

In 2012 Brady managed the Ballina Stephenites senior team.

Media career
Since retiring, Brady has worked as a sports journalist and pundit, appearing on TV3 and Newstalk. He also writes for the Intersport Elverys Blog. Brady is also active on Twitter. He was the subject of a 2020 Laochra Gael episode.

Personal life
Brady works as a medical sales rep. His wife is from Dublin; they have two children.

References

External links

1974 births
Living people
Ballina Stephenites Gaelic footballers
Connacht inter-provincial Gaelic footballers
Irish sports journalists
Mayo inter-county Gaelic footballers
People from Ballina, County Mayo